Lisa Scheibert (born 22 September 1963) is a Norwegian rower. She competed in the women's single sculls event at the 1984 Summer Olympics.

References

External links
 

1963 births
Living people
Norwegian female rowers
Olympic rowers of Norway
Rowers at the 1984 Summer Olympics
Sportspeople from Washington, D.C.